Gary Larson's Tales from the Far Side is an animated short film created in 1994 by Gary Larson, based on the Far Side comic strip. It was first shown as a Halloween special on CBS television, which aired on October 26, 1994. Later it was awarded the Grand Prix at the Annecy International Animation Film Festival.

Content
The film is a loosely-structured anthology film, jumping among several simple stories. Many of these situations use staple clichés of horror films, such as undead monsters and the dark and stormy night. The stories sometimes turn macabre, but are presented in a lighthearted fashion. They are mainly as those in the printed comic, including many background throwaway gags from well-known panels.

The characters and settings are all common to Larson's work, such as aliens, anthropomorphic animals and other objects, and cowboys in the Old West. The art style is essentially the same as that of the Far Side, with animation and sound effects.

Production
The animation was made in Vancouver, British Columbia, Canada, at director-animator Marv Newland's International Rocketship Productions.

The film features an original music score by jazz guitarist Bill Frisell. Some of the compositions from the soundtrack are included on his 1996 album Quartet.

Sequel
In 1997 the film spawned a sequel, Tales from the Far Side II. This follow-up was never broadcast on American television, but it aired in the UK on BBC and appeared in numerous film festivals. Both films were released on VHS and DVD and were available for purchase by U.S. addresses from the official Far Side website.

References

External links

1994 animated films
1994 short films
1994 television films
1994 films
1990s American animated films
1990s animated short films
1994 television specials
1990s American television specials
1990s animated television specials
American animated comedy films
Animated films based on comics
Halloween television specials
Television shows based on comic strips
CBS television specials
The Far Side
American anthology films